Maleo is a comune (municipality) in the Province of Lodi in the Italian region Lombardy, located about  southeast of Milan and about  southeast of Lodi.

Maleo borders the following municipalities: Pizzighettone, Castelgerundo, Codogno, Cornovecchio, Corno Giovine, San Fiorano, Santo Stefano Lodigiano.

References

External links
 Official website

Cities and towns in Lombardy
Castles in Italy